Saved by the Bell: The New Class is an American teen sitcom television series, and spinoff from Saved by the Bell. The New Class premiered on September 11, 1993. The series ran for seven seasons on NBC as a part of the network's TNBC Saturday morning line-up, airing its final episode on January 8, 2000. It was the fourth and, at seven seasons, the longest-running incarnation of the franchise.

The show had the same concept as the original series but featured a new group of students now roaming the halls of the fictional Bayside High School. Mr. Belding, played by Dennis Haskins, remained as the school's principal. Many of the stories were recycled plots of its parent series. The first-season cast included Robert Sutherland Telfer, Jonathan Angel, Isaac Lidsky, Natalia Cigliuti, Bianca Lawson, and Bonnie Russavage. Unlike the original series, which featured very few major cast changes throughout its run, The New Class regularly changed its core cast with Mr. Belding and Screech (from season 2 onward) being the only consistent characters.

Episodes

Cast and characters

Overview

Main

 Robert Sutherland Telfer as Scott Erikson (season 1) – Scott is the school's schemer in the mold of his predecessor, Zack Morris. He is also a transfer student from rival Valley High School. As Zack had done in the original series, Scott broke the "fourth wall" by addressing the audience. Early episodes featured Scott vying for the affection of Lindsay, the girlfriend of the school's jock, "Tommy D" in a manner very similar to the original series' early rivalry between Zack and Slater for the affections of Kelly. 
 Isaac Lidsky as Barton "Weasel" Wyzell (season 1) – Weasel is the nerdiest kid in school, and tends to be the successor of the original series' Screech. Weasel befriends Scott from the start and even tags along when Scott devises many of his schemes. He and Lindsay have been best friends since preschool and he has a huge crush on Megan, and much like Screech's crush on Lisa in the original series, Weasel's feelings are not reciprocated.
 Jonathan Angel as Tommy "D" De Luca (seasons 1–3) – Tommy is the jock of the gang, similar to the original series' A.C. Slater. He is the star quarterback for Bayside High's football team, and is the mechanic that fixes Mr. Belding's car in some episodes. He and Lindsay are a stable couple despite Lindsay being involved in every school organization and Tommy's macho behavior towards Scott.
 Bianca Lawson as Megan Jones (seasons 1–2) – Megan is the show's "brain" or over-achiever: she is one of the smartest students in school and doesn't let anyone forget it either. Her character is a combination of original series characters Lisa Turtle and Jessie Spano. Like Weasel and Lindsay, Megan is Vicki's best friend and is usually the voice of reason to the neurotic Vicki. A recurring gag in the series is her many attempts to avoid Weasel's unrequited love for her.
 Natalia Cigliuti as Lindsay Warner (seasons 1–3) – Lindsay is the most popular girl at Bayside High, and is involved in every school organization. She is essentially a successor to Kelly Kapowski. She is also the love interest for Tommy D. She's bubbly and cheery, and usually hangs with her best friends Megan and Vicki, and later Rachel. 
 Bonnie Russavage as Vicki Needleman (season 1) – Vicki is the neurotic best friend of Megan. She is a cheerleader and develops a crush on Scott. Her character has no precedent in the original series.
 Dennis Haskins as Principal Richard Belding – Belding is the principal of Bayside. He is portrayed in The New Class as even more bumbling and incompetent than he was on the original Saved by the Bell.
 Christian Oliver as Brian Keller (season 2) – Brian is a new transfer student from Switzerland. He is interested in Rachel, and is also a schemer.
 Sarah Lancaster as Rachel Meyers (guest star, season 1; main, seasons 2–4) – Rachel is the school's fashion expert and shop-a-holic. She is introduced in season 1 as a love interest for Scott, but is later Brian's love interest, and finally Ryan's.
 Spankee Rogers as Bobby Wilson (season 2) – Bobby is a bit of a goofball.
 Dustin Diamond as Samuel "Screech" Powers (seasons 2–7) – Screech is a former Bayside student (from the original Saved by the Bell). He returns to Bayside High initially on a work-study program, and later as Mr. Belding's assistant (Screech's college career is never mentioned again after season 2). Like his high school best friend Zack Morris, Screech schemes to pull things off when things go wrong, and he gets a little carried away on what he's doing.
 Richard Lee Jackson as Ryan Parker (seasons 3–5) – Ryan is a transfer student from Bayside's arch-rival Valley High, which causes problems at first. He is interested in Rachel, and Liz later on.
 Salim Grant as R.J. Collins (season 3) – R.J. is also a transfer from Valley High. He is a fashion expert, and a DJ in some episodes.
 Samantha Becker as Maria Lopez (seasons 3–7) – Maria is a transfer from Valley High and an outspoken cheerleader. She is reunited with her ex, Tony, in season 6.
 Ben Gould as Nicky Farina (seasons 4–7) – Nicky is Ryan's stepbrother from New York. He's the love interest of Katie and Maria.
 Lindsey McKeon as Katie Peterson (seasons 4–7) – Katie is a Bayside swimmer. She is Nicky's love interest.
 Anthony Harrell as Eric Little (seasons 4–7) – Eric is Bayside's star football player, and also a musician.
 Ashley Lyn Cafagna as Liz Miller (seasons 5–7) – Liz was a new girl to Bayside, after Rachel Meyers leaves to move to Boston. Liz is a sheltered star of Bayside's swim team, and the love interest of Ryan Parker.
 Tom Wade Huntington as Tony Dillon (seasons 6–7) – Tony transfers from Valley High to Bayside after Ryan Parker leaves. Like Eric and Nicky, Tony is also a football player. He is the ex of Maria, from her time at Valley High, and wants to get back together with her.

Production

Linkage to the original series
During the August 1993 repeat airing of the Saved by the Bell: Hawaiian Style television film, NBC ran promotions, set at Bayside High School and at The Max, where the cast of the original series and the cast of the first season of The New Class met and interacted with each other. These segments were a "passing of the torch" type of narrative. Also present were Dennis Haskins as Principal Richard Belding, and Bob Golic from Saved by the Bell: The College Years as the resident advisor from Cal U. One segment involves Zack and Scott in the school hallway, where Zack gives Scott a list pertaining to Mr. Belding to cause trouble for him. Mr. Belding overhears this and takes the list away, joyfully triumphant at outsmarting Zack. After he walks away, Zack hands Scott "the real list".

Cast changes
The show was notable for its cast changes. Each season featured one to three cast changes. The constant changes made it confusing for new viewers who were not watching the show from the start as cast members would come and go without any real explanation, and presumably contributed to lower ratings as the seasons progressed.

After the initial criticism of the first season of The New Class as essentially being a poor copy of the original series, the producers changed a number of elements of the show for the second season. Robert Sutherland Telfer, Isaac Lidsky, and Bonnie Russavage were all fired. Three new characters were introduced for the 1994–95 season. Brian Keller (Christian Oliver) became the new transfer student from Switzerland, Bobby Wilson (Spankee Rodgers) was the newest cool kid, and Rachel Meyers (Sarah Lancaster) was the school's fashion expert and shop-a-holic. Lancaster had previously appeared as Rachel in a single episode of the first season of the series.

The writers also invited back original cast member Dustin Diamond as Screech for the show's second season, as he became available after the cancellation of Saved by the Bell: The College Years. Providing continuity, Screech returned to Bayside High to work as Mr. Belding's assistant as part of a work/study program and also help build a bridge between the two series. Screech ended up remaining for the rest of the show's run, with very little mention being made throughout the story of his continued enrollment at California University. Further, the show's sets were redesigned to change the appearance of Bayside from that of the original series and Mr. Belding was given a new office.

Prior to Season 3 cast members Bianca Lawson, Christian Oliver and Spankee Rodgers left the show, and three new characters were brought on. Schemer Ryan Parker (Richard Lee Jackson), lively and outspoken cheerleader Maria Lopez (Samantha Esteban, then credited as Samantha Becker), and fashion-conscious R.J. "Hollywood" Collins (Salim Grant) were transfers from Valley High School.

At the end of the third season, original cast members Natalia Cigliuti and Jonathan Angel had decided to move on to other projects. Salim Grant was also let go and did not return for the new season, beginning in September 1996. New cast members Ben Gould (Nicky Farina), Lindsey McKeon (Katie Peterson), and Anthony Harrell (Eric Little) joined the show for its fourth season. Gould played Ryan's stepbrother from New York and was the love interest for Katie and later Maria. Katie was the newest "goody-goody" and Eric was the school's star football player.

Season 4 was Sarah Lancaster's final season and she was replaced in Season 5 by Ashley Lyn Cafagna as Liz Miller, a sheltered star of the school's swim team and is initially pursued by both stepbrothers, Ryan and Nicky. Also, the gang's original hangout, The Max, was renovated for the new season after the original burnt down in the fourth-season finale.

Season 6 followed and new cast member Tom Wade Huntington replaced Richard Lee Jackson as Tony Dillon, another Valley High transfer student and love interest for Maria. It was widely reported that Season 6 was in fact the final season for the series. In addition, NBC decided to prolong the series by splitting the number of episodes in half into another season (Season 7). These episodes had already been filmed at the same time as the sixth season and the cast remained the same.

Concluding the series in a similar fashion to the original, all characters go their separate ways into college. Eric is accepted into the Chicago School of the Arts to pursue his singing career and Liz is accepted into Stanford to pursue her Olympic aspirations (both constant themes throughout the series). Maria is accepted into UCLA and Tony is accepted into SDSU, prompting the two to end their relationship. Katie is accepted into Columbia, but is unable to go due to financial troubles. She instead plans to head for an unnamed Cal State University. Thus the series ends with Katie and Nicky's future in relative uncertainty, as he is accepted into NYU. Mr. Belding is offered the position of dean of students at the University of Tennessee at Chattanooga (the alma mater of Dennis Haskins). It is unknown what happened to Screech.

Home media
Image Entertainment released all seven seasons of Saved by the Bell: The New Class on DVD in Region 1 in 2005. However, these releases have been discontinued and are out of print.

Saved by the Bell: The New Class novels
There have been 10 novelizations based on the show, released by the publishers Boxtree Ltd and Aladdin Paperbacks, all written by Beth Cruise. The books all feature the main cast, and have the same storylines that relate to the main-plots in the TV spin-off. The first five books in the series focus on the first-season cast, and the last five books in the series feature the second-season cast.

References

External links
 

1993 American television series debuts
2000 American television series endings
1990s American high school television series
2000s American high school television series
1990s American teen sitcoms
2000s American teen sitcoms
1990s American sitcoms
2000s American sitcoms
English-language television shows
NBC original programming
New Class
TNBC
Television series by Universal Television
Television shows set in San Francisco
American television spin-offs
Television series by CBS Studios
Television series about teenagers